The Jacobite succession is the line through which Jacobites believed that the crowns of England, Scotland, and Ireland should have descended, applying primogeniture, since the deposition of James II and VII in 1688 and his death in 1701. It is in opposition to the line of succession to the British throne in law since that time.

Excluded from the succession by law because of their Roman Catholicism, James's Stuart descendants pursued their claims to the crowns as pretenders. James's son James Francis Edward Stuart (the 'Old Pretender') and grandson Charles Edward Stuart (the 'Young Pretender' or 'Bonnie Prince Charlie') actively participated in uprisings and invasions in support of their claim. From 1689 to the middle of the eighteenth century, restoration of the Jacobite succession to the throne was a major political issue in Britain, with adherents both at home and abroad. However, with Charles Edward's disastrous defeat at the Battle of Culloden in 1746, the Jacobite succession lost both its support and its political importance. James II and VII's other grandson, Henry Benedict Stuart, the last of his legitimate descendants, died in 1807, by which time the Jacobite succession ceased to have supporters in any number.

With Henry's death, the Jacobite claim was then notionally inherited by the Stuarts' nearest relatives, passing through a number of European royal families. Although the line of succession can continue to be traced, none of the Stuarts' subsequent heirs ever claimed the British throne, or the crowns of England, Scotland, or Ireland. A spokesman for the current heir, Franz, Duke of Bavaria, has described his position in the line of succession as "purely hypothetical" and a question "which does not concern him". However, there remains a small number of modern supporters who believe in the restoration of the Jacobite succession to the throne.

History

Background: the Glorious Revolution and Hanoverian succession
James II and VII, a Roman Catholic, was deposed, in what became known as the Glorious Revolution, when his Protestant opponents forced him to flee from England in 1688. The English Parliament deemed that James had, by fleeing his realms, abdicated his thrones. In theory, the deemed abdication applied to the crown of Ireland as well, as the English monarch was, in law, automatically also the monarch of Ireland. In practice, James lost the Irish crown to William of Orange because of his defeat in the Williamite War in Ireland. A Convention of the Scottish Estates took a different approach, and declared that James, by his wrongdoing, had forfeited the crown. Both offered the crowns, not to James's infant son, but to his Protestant daughter Mary and to her husband, William of Orange.

William and Mary were succeeded by Mary's sister, Anne, also a Protestant, who became Queen in 1702. The Act of Settlement 1701, passed shortly before Anne's accession, fixed the line of succession in law with the aim of permanently excluding James's descendants, and Roman Catholics in general, from the throne. The Parliament of England first barred Roman Catholics and James's descendants from inheriting the throne through the Bill of Rights 1689. The 1701 Act both confirmed these provisions and added to them by clarifying the line of succession should Anne die without surviving issue. As an English Act of Parliament, it was originally only part of English law, applying to the throne of England, but also to the throne of Ireland as the monarch of England was automatically also monarch of Ireland under the Irish Parliament's Crown of Ireland Act 1542. By virtue of Article II of the Treaty of Union between England and Scotland (put into law by the Acts of Union 1707), which defined the succession to the throne of Great Britain, the Act of Settlement became part of Scots law as well. The succession after Anne (who would die without leaving surviving children) was effectively settled on the Protestant House of Hanover. The Act named Sophia of Hanover, a granddaughter of James VI and I, and her descendants, as Anne's successor. Sophia died before Anne, and Sophia's son, George I, consequently acceded to the throne on Anne's death in 1714.

Stuart claims in exile
James II and VII, his son, James, the 'Old Pretender', and his grandsons, Charles, the 'Young Pretender' and Henry, Cardinal of York, never accepted the loss of their crowns and continued to press their claims from exile to varying degrees. They were supported by Jacobites in England, Ireland, and, particularly, in Scotland. The Jacobite succession, as a dynastic alternative for the throne, became a major factor in destabilising British politics between 1689 and 1746. Jacobitism was perceived by contemporaries to be a significant military and political threat, with invasions and uprisings in support of the exiled Stuarts occurring in 1689, 1715, 1719 and 1745.

Internationally, the Jacobite succession had limited recognition. Only France, Spain and the Papacy acknowledged James II's son as 'James III' on his father's death in 1701. By the Peace of Utrecht, France and Spain switched their recognition to the Hanoverian succession in 1713, although France subsequently recognised James as "King of Scotland" during the 1745 rising. Even the Papacy withdrew its recognition of the Jacobite succession when James, the Old Pretender, died in 1766.

With the defeat at the Battle of Culloden in 1746, Jacobitism was dealt a death blow and the Jacobite succession lost its significance as a dynastic alternative to the Hanoverians. Jacobitism went into a rapid decline and with the death of Charles, the 'Young Pretender' in 1788, the Jacobite succession lost what was left of its political importance. His younger brother, Henry, Cardinal of York, died in 1807 and the Royal House of Stuart thereby became extinct. With the death of the last Stuart, the House of Hanover was completely established as the only credible dynasty for the British throne.

Line of succession after the Stuarts
Applying primogeniture, the notional rights to the Stuarts' claim then passed to Henry's nearest relative, Charles Emmanuel IV of Sardinia, and from him on to other members of the House of Savoy, and then to the Houses of Austria-Este and Wittelsbach over the subsequent two centuries. Neither Charles Emmanuel nor any of the subsequent heirs have ever put forward any claims to the British throne. Aside from the brief Neo-Jacobite Revival in the years before the First World War, and a handful of modern adherents, any support for the Jacobite succession had disappeared by the end of the 18th century after it had been abandoned by even the inner core of its supporters. Although there are a small number of modern-day self-described 'Jacobites', not all of them support the restoration of the Jacobite succession to the throne.

Pretenders and subsequent heirs
English common law determined the line of succession based on male-preference primogeniture, and Scots law applied the same principle in relation to the crown of Scotland. Following the Glorious Revolution, this was altered by a series of English and Scottish statutes, namely the Claim of Right Act 1689, the Bill of Rights 1689 and the Act of Settlement 1701, but Jacobites did not accept their validity. The tables below set out the male-preference primogeniture line of succession, unaltered by those statutes.

Stuart pretenders 
The Stuarts who claimed the thrones of England, Scotland, and Ireland as pretenders after 1688 were:

Subsequent succession
Upon the extinction of the Royal Stuart line with the death of Henry, Cardinal of York, and applying male-preference primogeniture unaltered by the Act of Settlement 1701, the succession would have passed to the individuals named in the table below. However, unlike the Stuart pretenders, none of them has claimed the British throne (or the thrones of England, Scotland or Ireland) or incorporated the arms of these countries in their coats-of-arms. Nevertheless, since the 19th century, there have been small groups advocating the restoration of the Jacobite succession to the throne.

Family tree

See also
Alternative successions to the English and British Crown
Jacobite consorts
Jacobo Fitz-James Stuart, 17th Duke of Alba

Notes

References

External links
 Succession page of the website of the Royal Stuart Society.

Jacobitism
Lines of succession
House of Stuart
James II of England
Rival successions